Puerto Rico is an unincorporated territory of the United States located in the northeast Caribbean Sea. It is an archipelago that includes the main island of Puerto Rico and a number of smaller ones such as Mona, Culebra, and Vieques. The capital and most populous city is San Juan. Its official languages are Spanish and English, though Spanish predominates. The commonwealth's population is approximately 3.4 million.

Notable firms 
This list includes notable companies with primary headquarters located in the country. The industry and sector follow the Industry Classification Benchmark taxonomy. Organizations which have ceased operations are included and noted as defunct.

See also 

 List of government-owned corporations of Puerto Rico
 List of hotels in Puerto Rico
 List of newspapers in Puerto Rico

References 

Puerto Rico